The Handicraft Guild was an organization central to Arts and Crafts movement active in Minneapolis, Minnesota, United States, from 1904 to 1918. The Handicraft guild was founded, led, and staffed primarily by women, making it historically significant to women's art movements nationwide.

In addition to creating stone and metal art works, the Guild was an egalitarian school with the mission "[to] give authoritative instruction in design and its solution in terms of materials; also to furnish complete training for students desirous of becoming Craftsmen, Designers and Teachers."  Its pupils included Grant Wood.

The Handicraft Guild was revived after the turn of the 21st century and is a leading influence on the Arts in Minneapolis.

The Handicraft Guild Building is located at 89 10th Street South, Minneapolis, Minnesota and still stands today thanks to the efforts of the Minneapolis Heritage Preservation Commission. The building is now part of the City Lights Apartments high rise and is used as a brewpub.

Correspondence, photographs, and general research about topics, organizations, and individuals involved in or associated with the Handicraft Guild of Minneapolis are held by the Minnesota Historical Society.

External links
 The Handicraft Guild Building - Minneapolis Heritage Preservation Commission
 Handicraft Guild on Placeography.org
 Slideshow - What does it look like?
 Handicraft Guild Addition on Placeography.org
 Slideshow -What does it look like?
  The Handicraft Guild Art Collective 2015
 Development proposal 2015

References

Arts and Crafts movement
Arts organizations based in Minneapolis
History of Minneapolis
Arts organizations established in the 1900s
Arts organizations disestablished in the 20th century
1904 establishments in Minnesota
1918 disestablishments in Minnesota